Rancheria Creek is a stream in the U.S. state of Oregon. It is a tributary to South Fork Big Butte Creek.

Rancheria Creek took its name from an Indian settlement which stood near its banks.

References

Rivers of Oregon
Rivers of Jackson County, Oregon